Edward Fritz Guye (12 November 1887 – 4 July 1960) was an Australian politician who sat in the Victorian Legislative Assembly from 1940 to 1958.

Guye was born in Brentford, England, the son of Fritz Guye and his wife Gertrude Percy Ashton Glover. His father was a Swiss watchmaker who had settled in London. His father died in 1901 and Guye emigrated to Australia at the beginning of the 20th century. He enlisted in the AIF on 2 September 1914, and was sent to Europe in October. He returned to Australia in 1916.

In 1940, Guye was elected as Country Party representative for the Electoral district of Polwarth in the Victorian Legislative Assembly. In March 1949, Guye was one of six Country MPs to defect to the Liberal and Country Party established by Thomas Hollway as the Victorian division of the Liberal Party. In December 1949, he became Minister of Transport and a Vice-President of the Board of Land and Works.

Guye's brother Denis Guye, who remained in England, was an Olympic rower.

References

1887 births
1960 deaths
Members of the Victorian Legislative Assembly
Liberal Party of Australia members of the Parliament of Victoria
National Party of Australia members of the Parliament of Victoria
Australian Army officers
Australian military personnel of World War I
English emigrants to Australia
Australian people of Swiss descent
English people of Swiss descent
20th-century Australian politicians